HD 102776, also known by its Bayer designation j Centauri, is a suspected astrometric binary star system in the southern constellation of Centaurus. It has a blue-white hue and is faintly visible to the naked eye with a typical apparent visual magnitude of 4.30. The distance to this star is approximately 600 light years based on parallax, and it is drifting further away with a radial velocity of ~29 km/s. It is a member of the Lower Centaurus Crux subgroup of the Sco OB2 association.

The stellar classification of the visible component is B3V, matching a B-type main-sequence star. This is a Be star showing emission features in its Balmer lines due to a circumstellar disk of decreated gas. It is classified as a suspected Gamma Cassiopeiae type variable star with a visual magnitude varying from +4.30 down to +4.39.

References 

B-type main-sequence stars
Gamma Cassiopeiae variable stars
Be stars
Suspected variables

Centaurus (constellation)
Centauri, j
CD-63 00674
102776
057669
4537
Lower Centaurus Crux